Éric Sékou Chelle (born 11 November 1977) is a professional football manager and a former player who played as a centre-back. He is the manager of Mali. Born in Ivory Coast, he made five appearances for the Mali national team.

Playing career
Chelle holds a French passport and spent his whole career in France, appearing for Martigues, Valenciennes, Lens, Istres, and Chamois Niortais. At international level, he represented the Mali national team.

Coaching career
In May 2021 was appointed head coach of US Boulogne. He was dismissed by Boulogne on 11 December 2021, after the club gained three points in preceding ten games.

In 2022, Chelle was appointed manager of Mali.

References

External links

1977 births
Living people
Footballers from Abidjan
Association football central defenders
Citizens of Mali through descent
Malian footballers
Mali international footballers
French sportspeople of Malian descent
FC Martigues players
Valenciennes FC players
RC Lens players
FC Istres players
Ligue 1 players
Ligue 2 players
Malian football managers
US Boulogne managers
Mali national football team managers